The 2012 Foxtel Cup was the second season of Australian rules football knock-out cup competition involving clubs from the various state league competitions from around Australia.

The cup's purpose is to support and promote the second-tier Australian rules football competitions and to provide another way of developing lower-tier Australian Football League (AFL) players. It was originally designed to be a one-off, but due to a significant amount of public interest the AFL said the competition would continue through to at least 2016.

The competition began on 31 March 2012 and concluded with the grand final on 2 August 2012. Matches are played as curtain-raisers to Saturday AFL games or as stand-alone matches, with all games to be screened on Fox Sports. Prize-money was increased by about 20 per cent from the 2011 competition, with A$60,000 to be awarded to the winners.

The AFL invited three teams from the South Australian National Football League, the Victorian Football League and the West Australian Football League; two teams from the Tasmanian Football League; and five teams from the two conferences of the North East Australian Football League, including clubs from the Australian Capital Territory, New South Wales, the Northern Territory, and Queensland. , who had acceded to the AFL in 2012, were replaced by a second Tasmanian team.

Claremont became the 2012 Foxtel Cup champions when they defeated Werribee by 44 points in the Grand Final at Patersons Stadium on 2 August 2012. Claremont forward Tom Lee won the Coles Medal as best afield with his six-goal display.

2012 season

Participating clubs

 NEAFL Eastern Conference (2)
 Ainslie
 Sydney Hills Eagles
 NEAFL Northern Conference (3)
 Morningside
 Mount Gravatt
 Northern Territory
 SANFL (3)
 South Adelaide
 Port Adelaide Magpies
 West Adelaide

 TFL (2)
 Burnie
 Launceston
 VFL (3)
 Port Melbourne
 Werribee
 Williamstown
 WAFL (3)
 Claremont
 Subiaco
 West Perth

Club details

Stadiums

Fixture

Bracket

Round of 16

^ Although stand-alone with regards to AFL games, the Ainslie v West Perth game was played as a curtain-raiser to the NEAFL game between UWS Giants and Queanbeyan.

Quarter-finals

Semi-finals

Grand Final

References

External links
 Official Foxtel Cup website
 Official AFL Canberra website
 AFL Northern Territory
 AFL Queensland State Site
 South Australian National Football League – official website
 Official Sydney AFL Site
 Tasmanian Football League Website
 Victorian Football League – official website
 Western Australian Football League – official website

Foxtel Cup
Foxtel